Drinovačko Brdo is a village in Bosnia and Herzegovina. According to the 1991 census, the village is located in the municipality of Grude.

It is located at the Bosnia-Croatia border.

Demographics 
According to the 2013 census, its population was 396.

References

Populated places in Grude